Grant Stuard (born October 15, 1998) is an American football linebacker for the Indianapolis Colts of the National Football League (NFL). He played college football at Houston, and was selected by the Tampa Bay Buccaneers with the final pick in the 2021 NFL Draft, making him that year's Mr. Irrelevant.

Early life
Stuard helped take care of his four siblings while growing up, as his mother battled a drug addiction and his father spent time in prison.

College career
Stuard played four years with the University of Houston, primarily as a linebacker, although he also played some running back.

In the 2017 season his freshman season he played in 7 games before missing 4 games and the 2017 Hawaii Bowl due to a torn meniscus. He recorded 2 assisted tackles both against Rice University. In the 2018 season Stuard played 13 games and had 1 start. He led the 2018 Houston Cougars football team with 11 special teams tackles. He also played running back late in the year. He had 5 attempts and 35 yards running the ball, along with 30 tackles, 18 solo and 12 assisted. In the 2019 season Stuard started all 12 games. He had 97 tackles which led the team and had 9.5 tackles for loss good for third in the American Athletic Conference. He had 1 sack and 4 pass deflections. Stuard was named to the 2019 American Athletic All-Conference Second-team. In the 2020 season he was a team captain for his senior year and led the Cougars in tackles: he made 61 total tackles (including 35 solo tackles) in a COVID-shortened 7-game regular season.  He led the American Athletic Conference in tackles per game with 8.4 tackles/game. For his senior season, he changed his uniform number from 3 to 0.

Stuard skipped the 2020 New Mexico Bowl to prepare for the upcoming NFL draft.

Professional career

Tampa Bay Buccaneers
The Tampa Bay Buccaneers chose Stuard with the final pick (259th overall) of the 2021 NFL Draft, making him that year's Mr. Irrelevant. Stuard signed his four-year rookie contract with Tampa Bay on May 13, 2021.

Indianapolis Colts
On August 30, 2022, Stuard and a seventh-round pick were traded to the Indianapolis Colts for a sixth-round pick.

In the media
Stuard appeared in a television advertisement for Uber Eats during his rookie season; the ad humorously referenced his Mr. Irrelevant status by cutting him off as he is about to say his own name.

References

1998 births
Living people
American football linebackers
Houston Cougars football players
People from Conroe, Texas
Players of American football from Texas
Sportspeople from the Houston metropolitan area
Tampa Bay Buccaneers players
Indianapolis Colts players